Bridouxia praeclara is a species of tropical freshwater snail with a gill and an operculum, aquatic gastropod mollusk in the family Paludomidae.

This species is found in Burundi, Tanzania, and Zambia. Its natural habitat is freshwater lakes. It is threatened by habitat loss.

References

Paludomidae
Gastropods described in 1885
Taxonomy articles created by Polbot
Taxa named by Jules René Bourguignat